Kutchi-Swahili, or Cutchi-Swahili, is a Swahili-based creole derived from the Kutchi language of the Kutch district in Gujarat and spoken among the Indian population of East Africa. It is the native language of some Gujarati families from Zanzibar that have settled in the larger cities of mainland Tanzania and Kenya, and is used as a second language by others of the Indian community. In these areas of East Africa, the language is typically only used by Muslim groups, whereas Hindu groups use Gujarati instead. 

In the language, words that are taken from Swahili are often modified to fit Kutchi pronunciation patterns; for instance, the Swahili word , meaning "plate", becomes  in Kutchi-Swahili.

Maho (2009) assigns different codes to Kutchi-Swahili and Asian Swahili (Kibabu), and Ethnologue also notes that these may not be the same.

References

Asian-Kenyan culture
Asian diaspora in Tanzania
Gujarati diaspora
Indian-Kenyan culture
Indian diaspora in Tanzania
Swahili-based pidgins and creoles
Culture of Zanzibar
Languages attested from the 2nd millennium